The Centre of Policy and Legal Reform (Tsentr polityko-pravovykh reform) is a Ukrainian non-governmental think tank founded in 1996.

Mission 

The mission of the CPLR is to support the implementation of the institutional reforms, which could provide the democracy, rule of law and proper governance in Ukraine.

History and achievements 

November 18, 2014 was the 18th anniversary of the Centre of Policy and Legal Reform. There  are 18 activities which were realized by our team during 18 years:

1.  The participation in the creating and developing of the Concept of the administrative reform in Ukraine. The Concept was approved by President of Ukraine in 1998.

2. The developing of the Law of Ukraine "On local state administration". It was adopted by Verkhovna Rada in 1999.

3.  The participation in the developing of the Law of Ukraine On the Cabinet of Ministers of Ukraine. Till 1996 the experts of CPLR was struggling for its adoption. It was adopted by Parliament 8 times, but was vetoed by the President. Only in 2008 it was adopted (but in 2010-2011 it was spoiled by the regime of Yanukovych, but in 2014 it was returned almost to the previous edition).

4.  The developing of the draft law on the Central Executive Authorities in 2002 and further advocacy of its adoption (finally, in 2011 it was adopted, but with amendments which made its quality worse).

5. A years (1998-2002) of the lobbying of the activity of the Verkhovna Rada of Ukraine, particularly- the participation in the filling of the web-site  www.zakon.gov.ua with the draft laws, which have been putted forward to the Parliament, when it was not posted on the parliament's web-site yet.

6. The preparation of the draft law  on access to court decisions, which was adopted by parliament in 2005 and the Unified state register of the court decisions is working on its basic.

7. The developing of the concept of the creating of the administrative courts and the Code of the Administrative judiciary, which was adopted by Verkhovna Rada in 2005.

8. The developing of the judiciary's reform concept and of the draft law on the Judicial System and Status of Judges, which was adopted by parliament in 2010, but with amendments, which become negative for its quality in general.

9. The Law "On the access to the public information". The draft law was prepared by CPLR in 2008 and was adopted by Verkhovna Rada in 2011 after the wide campaign of media and public organizations.

10. The developing of the theory of the administrative services and the preparation of the Concept of reforming of the system of administrative services (approved by the Government in 2006), support the establishment of the pilot one-stop shops in the numbers of the cities of Ukraine and the active participation in the preparation of the draft law on the administrative services, which was established in 2012. Workshops for the representatives of the local governments regarding the organization of the one-stop shops and in the cities where one-stop shops already exist- for the workers. Providing the public monitoring of the one-stop shops’ work.

11. The active participation in the preparation of the Administrative-procedure Code, which is waiting its adoption till 2008. It was already twice directed to the Verkhovna Rada by the Cabinet of Ministers of Ukraine, but still is not adopted.

12.  The preparation and reasoning of the reform of the institute of the administrative responsibility and also of the Code of administrative offenses (which is still waiting for the adoption by the Parliament of Ukraine).

13. The participation in the developing of the concepts and package of draft laws on the administrative-territorial reform (2008-2009 and 2014 years).

14. The active participation in the developing of the new Criminal-procedure Code of Ukraine and draft law on free legal aid, which were adopted in 2012.

15. The preparation of the Green and White books of the constitutional reform, which include the list of the problems of the Constitution and the proposals concerning solving of such problems.

16. The active participation concerning the improving of the legislation regarding the peaceful assembles and freedom of the associations, particularly, of the draft laws on the public associations (was adopted in 2012) and on freedom of peaceful assembles (is still reviewing in the parliament).

17. The participation in the developing and the years of the lobbying of the draft law on the persecutor’s office. The law was adopted in 2014.

18.  Permanent work in the area of the combating corruption in Ukraine. Particularly, the participation in the developing of the anticorruption legislation, providing the anticorruption expertise of the draft laws and of the legislation.

Activity 
The CPLR is promoting institutional organization of Ukraine as the state which ensures human rights and is responsible to the citizens. Although CPLR isn’t classical human rights organization, exactly the value of human rights defines the nature and purpose of the organization.
CPLR elaborates and promotes implementing reforms in Ukraine in such areas:

Constitutional order;
 Public administration
 Judiciary
 Criminal justice
 Combating corruption
 European integration

Donors 
The donors of CPLR's projects are next:
     The Embassy of the USA in Ukraine
     Open society European policy institute (Brussels)
     International Renaissance Foundation
     European Commission
     Matra social transformation programme
     USAID
     The ministry of International relationships of Denmark
     German Agency for Technical Cooperation (GTZ)
     Swiss-Ukrainian Decentralization Support Project (DESPRO)
     Project against corruption in Ukraine (UPAC) — Council of Europe
     PAUCI
     The parliament development program of the Indiana university
     East-West British Centre, UK
     Government Funds
     Canadian International Development Agency (CIDA)
     OSCE
     Eurasia Foundation
     ABA CEELI
     Swiss Agency for Development and Cooperation ( SDС)

Annual budgets 
The Grant Amounts in Euro for the last 3 years are:

2012 - 245,555

2013 - 289,150

2014 - 331,345

Team 
The Head of the board of CPLR is Ihor Koliushko.  The core expert staff of the CPLR such as: Victor Tymoschuk - expert on public administration, PhD, the Deputy head of the Board of CPLR; Roman Kuybida – expert on judiciary, PhD, lecturer of Taras Shevchenko National University of Kyiv; Oleksandr Banchuk - expert on criminal justice, PhD; Mykola Khavroniuk - Doctor of Law, professor, honored Lawyer of Ukraine has not been changed within over 10 years. Key experts of CPLR who are coordinators of research work in directions of our activities have PhD degrees and now are leading experts in these areas in Ukraine.

The impact on the political and legal development 
The work of CPLR is useful not only for Ukraine. CPLR’s experience in the areas of administrative justice and administrative offences is being evaluated by international organizations such as OSCE/ODIHR and UNDP as worth to be shared with other post-soviet countries. So experts of CPLR have been involved in work on Code of Administrative Justice, Code of Administrative Offenses and Code of Administrative Procedures in Kazakhstan and Kyrgyzstan.

References

External links 
Web-site of Centre for policy of Legal Reforms

Think tanks based in Ukraine
Think tanks established in 1996
1996 establishments in Ukraine